The Levoberezhny constituency (No.115) is a Russian legislative constituency in Lipetsk Oblast. The constituency was created in 2016 after Lipetsk Oblast constituencies were gerrymandered to dilute the power of urban voting in the city of Lipetsk. Levoberezhny constituency covers half of Lipetsk and its southern suburbs (previously part of Lipetsk constituency), as well as rural districts in southern Lipetsk Oblast (previously part of Yelets constituency).

Members elected

Election results

2016

|-
! colspan=2 style="background-color:#E9E9E9;text-align:left;vertical-align:top;" |Candidate
! style="background-color:#E9E9E9;text-align:left;vertical-align:top;" |Party
! style="background-color:#E9E9E9;text-align:right;" |Votes
! style="background-color:#E9E9E9;text-align:right;" |%
|-
|style="background-color: " |
|align=left|Mikhail Tarasenko
|align=left|United Russia
|
|60.10%
|-
|style="background-color:"|
|align=left|Sergey Tokarev
|align=left|Communist Party
|
|13.31%
|-
|style="background-color:"|
|align=left|Larisa Ksenofontova
|align=left|A Just Russia
|
|10.22%
|-
|style="background-color:"|
|align=left|Oleg Khomutinnikov
|align=left|Liberal Democratic Party
|
|8.18%
|-
|style="background:"| 
|align=left|Aleksandr Trofimov
|align=left|Communists of Russia
|
|2.98%
|-
|style="background:"| 
|align=left|Yevgeny Rozhnov
|align=left|Yabloko
|
|2.46%
|-
| colspan="5" style="background-color:#E9E9E9;"|
|- style="font-weight:bold"
| colspan="3" style="text-align:left;" | Total
| 
| 100%
|-
| colspan="5" style="background-color:#E9E9E9;"|
|- style="font-weight:bold"
| colspan="4" |Source:
|
|}

2021

|-
! colspan=2 style="background-color:#E9E9E9;text-align:left;vertical-align:top;" |Candidate
! style="background-color:#E9E9E9;text-align:left;vertical-align:top;" |Party
! style="background-color:#E9E9E9;text-align:right;" |Votes
! style="background-color:#E9E9E9;text-align:right;" |%
|-
|style="background-color: " |
|align=left|Mikhail Tarasenko (incumbent)
|align=left|United Russia
|
|48.07%
|-
|style="background-color:"|
|align=left|Sergey Tokarev
|align=left|Communist Party
|
|16.25%
|-
|style="background-color:"|
|align=left|Larisa Ksenofontova
|align=left|A Just Russia — For Truth
|
|6.46%
|-
|style="background:"| 
|align=left|Vitaly Bodrov
|align=left|Communists of Russia
|
|6.22%
|-
|style="background-color: "|
|align=left|Oleg Tokarev
|align=left|Party of Pensioners
|
|5.48%
|-
|style="background-color:"|
|align=left|Maksim Zachinyayev
|align=left|Liberal Democratic Party
|
|5.05%
|-
|style="background-color: " |
|align=left|Andrey Kocherov
|align=left|New People
|
|4.33%
|-
|style="background-color:"|
|align=left|Sergey Zvyagin
|align=left|Rodina
|
|2.29%
|-
|style="background-color:"|
|align=left|Yelena Vasina
|align=left|The Greens
|
|2.13%
|-
|style="background:"| 
|align=left|Aleksandr Shkurko
|align=left|Party of Growth
|
|0.85%
|-
| colspan="5" style="background-color:#E9E9E9;"|
|- style="font-weight:bold"
| colspan="3" style="text-align:left;" | Total
| 
| 100%
|-
| colspan="5" style="background-color:#E9E9E9;"|
|- style="font-weight:bold"
| colspan="4" |Source:
|
|}

References

Russian legislative constituencies
Politics of Lipetsk Oblast